Prasophyllum catenemum is a species of orchid endemic to South Australia. It has a single tubular leaf and up to twenty white and green to purplish flowers. It is only known from a small area of the coast of the state where it grows in shrubland which is often engulfed by unstable sand dunes.

Description
As with others in the genus, the flowers are inverted so that the labellum is above the column rather than below it. The upturned part of the labellum is crinkled and there is a yellowish-green callus in the centre of the labellum. Flowering occurs in September and October.

Taxonomy and naming
Prasophyllum catenemum was first formally described in 2006 by David Jones from a specimen collected near Streaky Bay and the description was published in Australian Orchid Research. The specific epithet (catenemum) is derived from the Ancient Greek word catenemos meaning "wind-blown" referring to the habitat of this species.

Distribution and habitat
This leek orchid grows in coastal areas of South Australia between Streaky Bay and Smoky Bay where it grows in shrubland which is sometimes engulfed by constantly moving, unstable sand dunes.

References

External links 
 

catenemum
Flora of South Australia
Endemic orchids of Australia
Plants described in 2006